Clark is a dormant submarine volcano located off the northern coast of New Zealand and is one of the South Kermadec Ridge Seamounts.

History 
The first evidence of the existence of Clark was found during 1988 GLORIA side-scan mapping. These interpretations were later confirmed via photography and oceanic dredging in early 1992 during the 3-week Rapuhia cruise.

In 2006, during a New Zealand-American NOAA Vents Program expedition, sulfide chimneys and diffuse hydrothermal venting were observed.

There have been no known eruptions of Clark.

See also

References 

Submarine volcanoes
Seamounts of New Zealand
Volcanoes of New Zealand